The cabinet of Carl Bildt was the cabinet of Sweden from 4 October 1991 to 7 October 1994 with Carl Bildt as the prime minister. It was a coalition government between the Moderate Party, the Centre Party, the Liberal People's Party and the Christian Democrats.

Ministers

External links
The Government and the Government Offices of Sweden

1991 establishments in Sweden
Bildt, Carl
Politics of Sweden
1994 disestablishments in Sweden
Cabinets established in 1991
Cabinets disestablished in 1994